Moglen is a surname. Notable people with the surname include:

Eben Moglen (born 1959), American professor
Helene Moglen (born 1936), American feminist literary scholar and author